Jorge Vásquez can refer to:

 Jorge Vásquez (Chilean footballer) (1922-2017), Chilean footballer
 Jorge Vásquez (Peruvian footballer)
 Jorge Vásquez (Salvadoran footballer) (born 1945), Salvadoran footballer
 Jorge Vásquez (baseball) (born 1978), Dominican baseball player

See also
 Jorge Vázquez (disambiguation)